Trianaea naeka is a species of plant in the family Solanaceae. It is endemic to Ecuador.  Its natural habitat is subtropical or tropical moist montane forests.

References

Flora of Ecuador
Solanoideae
Vulnerable plants
Taxonomy articles created by Polbot